The Love Story of Cesare Ubaldi is a 1922 German silent film directed by  and starring Johannes Riemann, Margit Barnay, and Ferdinand von Alten.

Cast

References

Bibliography

External links

1922 films
Films of the Weimar Republic
German silent feature films
Films directed by Heinz Schall
German black-and-white films
1920s German films